Bak Il (born September 2, 1946 – July 31, 2019) was a South Korean actor and voice actor who joined the Munhwa Broadcasting Corporation's Voice Acting Division in 1970.

He died in his sleep on July 31, 2019, aged 72.

Roles

Broadcast TV
 CSI: Crime Scene Investigation (replacing William Petersen, Korea TV Edition, MBC)
 24 (replacing Dennis Haysbert, Korea TV Edition, MBC)
 Smallville (replacing John Schneider, Korea TV Edition, MBC)
 NYPD Blue (replacing David Caruso, Korea TV Edition, MBC)
 Time Tracks (replacing Jack Scalia, Korea TV Edition, SBS)

Movie dubbing

Live action
Pierce Brosnan
 The Lawnmower Man (Dr. Lawrence Angelo, Korea TV Edition, MBC)
 Mrs. Doubtfire (Stuart Dunmeyer, Korea TV Edition, SBS)
 GoldenEye (James Bond, Korea TV Edition, MBC)
 The Mirror Has Two Faces (Alex, Korea TV Edition, MBC)
 Tomorrow Never Dies (James Bond, Korea TV Edition, MBC)
 The World Is Not Enough (James Bond, Korea TV Edition, MBC)
 The Tailor of Panama (Andy Osnard, Korea TV Edition, SBS)
 After the Sunset (Max Burdett, Korea TV Edition, MBC)
Michael Douglas
 Fatal Attraction (Dan Gallagher, Korea TV Edition, MBC)
 Black Rain (Nick Conklin, Korea TV Edition, SBS)
 Shining Through (Ed Leland, Korea TV Edition, SBS)
 Disclosure (Tom Sanders, Korea TV Edition, SBS)
 The Ghost and the Darkness (Charles Remington, Korea TV Edition, MBC)
 A Perfect Murder (Steven Taylor, Korea TV Edition, SBS)
 The In-Laws (Steve Tobias, Korea TV Edition, SBS)
George Clooney
 One Fine Day (Jack Taylor, Korea TV Edition, MBC)
 The Peacemaker (Lieutenant Colonel Thomas Devoe, Korea TV Edition, MBC)
 Good Night, and Good Luck (Fred W. Friendly, Korea TV Edition, MBC)
 Double Jeopardy (replacing Bruce Greenwood, Korea TV Edition, MBC)
 Hamlet (Korea TV Edition, MBC)
 Heat (replacing Al Pacino, Korea TV Edition, MBC)
 In the Line of Fire (replacing Clint Eastwood, Korea TV Edition, MBC)
 Independence Day (replacing Bill Pullman, Korea TV Edition, MBC)
 Master and Commander: The Far Side of the World (replacing Russell Crowe, Korea TV Edition, MBC)
 Nick of Time (replacing Christopher Walken, Korea TV Edition, MBC)
 Out of Africa (replacing Robert Redford, Korea TV Edition, MBC)
 The Day After Tomorrow (replacing Dennis Quaid, Korea TV Edition, MBC)
 The Godfather (replacing Marlon Brando, Korea TV Edition, MBC)
 The Mission (replacing Robert De Niro, Korea TV Edition, MBC)
 The Shawshank Redemption (replacing Tim Robbins, Korea TV Edition, MBC)
 The Shipping News (replacing Kevin Spacey, Korea TV Edition, SBS)
 Up Close & Personal (replacing Robert Redford, Korea TV Edition, MBC)
 Vertical Limit (replacing Bill Paxton, Korea TV Edition, MBC)

Animated films
 The Incredibles (Mr. Incredible, Korea Movie Edition, Walt Disney)
 Toy Story (Buzz Lightyear, Korea Movie Edition, Walt Disney)
 Toy Story 2 (Buzz Lightyear, Korea Movie Edition, Walt Disney)
 Toy Story 3 (Buzz Lightyear, Korea Movie Edition, Walt Disney)
 Big Hero 6 (Stan Lee, Korea Movie Edition, Walt Disney)

Animated series
 The Loud House (Monster Trucks, Korea Movie Edition, Korea TV Edition, SBS)

See also
 Munhwa Broadcasting Corporation
 MBC Voice Acting Division

References

External links
 Daum Cafe Voice Actor Bak Il Homepage (in Korean)
 MBC Voice Acting division Bak Il blog (in Korean)

South Korean male voice actors
1946 births
2019 deaths
Male actors from Seoul
20th-century South Korean male actors